Cyperus rigidellus is a sedge of the family Cyperaceae that is native to Australia.

Description
The terete culms are three sided with sharp edges and concave sides and are often rough higher up. It blooms between April to November producing brown-red flowers. The  head-like or simple inflorescence has one to four branches that  in length. The flattened spikelets occur in clusters of 5 to 15 each containing 6 to 25 flowers. After flowering trigonous pale brown nuts form with a narrow-obovoid to narrow-ellipsoid shape.

Taxonomy
The species was initially confused with Cyperus gilesii and C. enervis. It was first formally described as a variety of C. gracilis by the botanist George Bentham in 1878 (as C. gracilis var. rigidellus). Charles Baron Clarke promoted it to the independent species Mariscus rigidellus in 1908, John McConnell Black moved it back to Cyperus in 1929 as part of the work Additions and Corrections as published in Flora of South Australia. There are several synonyms.

Distribution
It is found in all mainland states and territories in Australia. In Western Australia it is found along stream and creek, around clay pans, on flood plains and other damp areas in the Mid West, Pilbara, Gascoyne and Goldfields-Esperance regions where it grows in loamy-sand or clay-sand soils. In New South Wales it is found in inland areas usually in ephemerally wet places including floodways and roadside drains.

See also
List of Cyperus species

References

Plants described in 1929
Flora of Western Australia
rigidellus
Taxa named by John McConnell Black